Filip Teodorescu (born December 26, 1951) is a Romanian diplomat. He was the Romanian Ambassador to Moldova (2003–2009).

Biography 

Filip Teodorescu was appointed as the Romanian ambassador to Chişinău in March 2003 and arrived at post in April 2003. On April 8, 2009, President of Moldova Vladimir Voronin declared Romanian Ambassador Filip Teodorescu and Councilor-Minister, Ioan Gaborean, personae non gratae, claiming that "their activity was inconsistent with their diplomatic status" after the 2009 Moldova civil unrest. But the new Minister of Foreign Affairs and European Integration (Moldova), Iurie Leancă, canceled this decision.

See also
 Embassy of Romania in Chişinău
 Moldovan–Romanian relations

References

External links 
 Leancă a anulat notele prin care fostul ambasador român Filip Teodorescu era declarat persona non grata în Republica Moldova
 FILIP TEODORESCU
 The Ambassador Filip Teodorescu was declared "persona non grata"
 Filip Teodorescu
 Filip Teodorescu is not persona non-grata

Living people
1951 births
Diplomats from Bucharest
Eastern Orthodox Christians from Romania
Ambassadors of Romania to Moldova
University of Bucharest alumni
University of Tirana alumni